Eric Mensik (born December 18, 1987) is a former American football offensive tackle. He was signed by the Arizona Cardinals as an undrafted free agent in 2011. He played college football at Oklahoma from 2007 to 2010, beginning as a tight end and later moving to the offensive line. He was selected as a first-team All-Big 12 player after the 2010 college football season.  Mensik was signed by the Arizona Cardinals as an undrafted free agent following the end of the NFL lockout in 2011. He was waived on August 29, 2011.

References

External links
 Oklahoma Sooners bio

1987 births
Living people
People from Rosenberg, Texas
Players of American football from Texas
American football offensive tackles
Oklahoma Sooners football players
Arizona Cardinals players